Shaw Mayer's brush mouse (Pogonomelomys mayeri) is a species of rodent in the family Muridae.
It is found in West Papua, Indonesia and Papua New Guinea.

References

Pogonomelomys
Rodents of Papua New Guinea
Mammals of Western New Guinea
Mammals described in 1932
Taxonomy articles created by Polbot
Endemic fauna of New Guinea
Taxa named by Walter Rothschild
Taxa named by Guy Dollman
Rodents of New Guinea